Jadesola Osiberu is a Nigerian writer, director and producer and founder of Greoh Studios.  She is known for Isoken (2017), Sugar Rush (2019), Brotherhood (2022) and Gangs of Lagos, the first Nigerian original film set to stream exclusively on Amazon Prime Video. In September 2022, Osiberu's Greoh Studios signed a three-year deal with Amazon to develop and produce original scripted TV series and feature films.

Early life and education 
Born to a royal family in 1985, Osiberu's father, Oba Adewale Osiberu is the Elepe of Epe Sagamu. Osiberu had her secondary education in Ibadan, before obtaining a Computer Systems Engineering degree from University of Manchester. She is also an alumna of Pan-Atlantic University, where she studied Media and Communications.

Career
Despite working professionally as a software developer after graduation, Osiberu decided to change career to film-making. In celebrating the Women's History Month, Pulse included her in its list of ten women making waves by developing content in Nigerian film industry. Osiberu started her production company, Tribe85 Productions in 2017 with the aim of "telling African stories to a global audience". During an interview with BellaNaija, her work ethic, attention to detail and creative drive was praised by the interviewer.

In 2018, she headlined Nollywood Film Festival in Scotland.

In 2017, Osiberu wrote and directed Isoken, a film about the challenges faced by an unmarried female professionals amidst pressure from family, as well as romantic interracial relationships in modern Nigerian setting. For her directorial role, she won best director at 2018 Africa Magic Viewers Choice Awards and got a Africa Movie Academy Award for Best Director nomination.

The film was also the subject of scholarly discussions with the titular character being characterized with traits of feminism. Culture Custodian highlighted how the theme of the film is set up to fight misogyny in the Nigerian patriarchal society.

Filmography

Awards and nominations

Personal life
Osiberu had her marriage ceremony on May 11, 2019 in Sagamu, Ogun State.

See also
 List of Nigerian film producers
 List of Nigerian film directors

References

External links
 

1985 births
Living people
Nigerian film directors
Alumni of the University of Manchester
Pan-Atlantic University alumni
Africa Magic Viewers' Choice Awards winners
Nigerian film producers
Nigerian writers
Nigerian women writers
People from Ogun State
Nigerian sound editors